KWRN (Radio Lazer 99.5 & 1550 AM) is a radio station broadcasting a Regional Mexican format. Licensed to Apple Valley, California, United States, it serves the Victor Valley area.  The station is currently owned by Lazer Broadcasting.

History
KWRN went on the air by 1991 as KAPL after several years of construction permit extensions. The callsign changed to KWRN in 1994, coinciding with Major Market's acquisition of the station.

In November 2016, translator 94.3 K232EW in Ventura was purchased from Southern California Public Radio for $40,000. On November 15, 2016, the Federal Communications Commission granted a construction permit to move K232EW from Ventura to Apple Valley and change the frequency to 99.5 MHz with an accompanying change of call letters to K258DE.

References

External links

 
 

WRN
WRN